Picture of Innocence may refer to: 

"Picture of Innocence", a track on the album Bananas by Deep Purple
"Picture of Innocence", an episode from Series 10 of the British TV crime series Midsomer Murders